DJMax Technika 3 (Korean: 디제이맥스 테크니카3) is a music arcade game published and developed by Pentavision in South Korea, and is a sequel to the earlier DJMax Technika 2 arcade game in the DJMax game series.

Announcement
The development of DJMax Technika 3 was publicly announced by Pentavision on September 7, 2011. The announcement explained that the game would feature music tracks from artists in earlier DJMax games such as Croove, NDLee and Tsukasa, in addition to new artists, including Laurent Newfield and TANUKI. Tracks by the Korean girl band KARA were also mentioned to be included within the game.

According to the official press release by Pentavision, "the game will feature new and upgraded content of the rhythm game loved by enthusiasts, and the stylish design will attract new players... information regarding location testing schedules and support information will eventually be released".

Game information

As with earlier DJMax Technika games, Technika 3 utilizes the Platinum Crew service for online play and rankings. The Crew Challenge mode includes various mission modes of varying difficulties and involves various "crew" teamplay elements.

Various merchandise was sold by Pentavision, including the DJMAX Technika 3 Limited Edition OST package, as well as a Platinum Blue Collection which includes the game soundtrack, Platinum Blue International IC Card (for gameplay), a card case and stickers. The Platinum Blue Collection was limited to a number of 2000 copies for sale. The International IC cards can be used on any Technika 3 machine worldwide, however data cannot be transferred from region to region, similar to the limited edition Technika 2 Signature IC cards that were bundled within game soundtrack packages.

Gameplay
In the same playing style with earlier editions of DJMax Technika, the game requires the player to touch musical notes which appear at various points on the arcade touchscreen in sync with the rhythm of a song as it plays, specifically as a bar which moves along the upper and bottom halves of the screen crosses the notes. There are various different note types as well, and each category of notes are played in a different manner. Whilst playing, the fever meter builds up as notes are successfully touched on progression; once full the player may activate Fever mode, which increases the score value of each note for a limited duration. The "groove meter" will decrease if notes are missed, and once empty the player fails the chart and the game concludes.

The game features five game modes:

Star Mixing: Explained within the in-game menu as "normal difficulty", this single player mode uses three rows of notes. One play involves three songs which are manually selected by the player.
Pop Mixing: Explained within the in-game menu as "hard difficulty", this single player mode uses four rows of notes. One play involves three songs which are manually selected by the player.
Club Mixing: Explained within the in-game menu as "maniac difficulty", this single player mode uses four rows of notes. The player selects a mixing set of songs that contain a limited range of six songs, and of these six, three songs are chosen to be played in any order determined by the player. A fourth song is determined based on the player's performance.
Crew Race: Explained within the in-game menu as "various difficulty", this is an online mode. One play involves three songs, and the mode involves the  player competing against a challenge based on computer-generated scores.
Crew Challenge: Explained within the in-game menu as "various difficulty", this is an online mode. This mode features competitions, events and game challenge missions, and up to three songs are played. The types of missions available are:
Crew Mission: Mode based on cooperative play, which gives rewards when team players clear the mission.
Challenge Mission: Mode containing challenges to be cleared.
Special Mission: Mode containing missions from competitions and events.

The player is able to record their scores and gather MAX points by saving data on an IC card. MAX points are used to purchase additional songs, effectors, DJ icons, notes and emblems.

Game Data

Technika 3 New songs
As of present, list of known new songs include:

New songs from earlier DJMAX games
 
Beautiful Girl – Seth Vogt Electro Vanity Remix / DJMax Portable 3
Become Myself / DJMax Portable 3
Break! / DJMax Portable 3
Drum Town / DJMax Portable 3
Everything / DJMax Portable 3
Funky People / DJMax Portable 3
Gone Astray / DJMax Portable 3
Hanz Up! / DJMax Portable 3
IF / DJMax Portable 3
Leave me Alone / DJMax Portable 3
Luv is True / DJMax Portable 3
Mellow D Fantasy / DJMax Portable 3
Raise me up / DJMax Portable 3
Season ~Warm Mix~ / DJMax Portable 3
The Rain Maker / DJMax Portable 3
RockSTAR / Tapsonic
Chemical Slave / Tapsonic
Watch Your Step / Tapsonic

Complete songlist

Club mixing disc sets

Technika 1 Disc Set

Threshold to get High Boss : 11

Threshold to get High Boss : 11

Threshold to get High Boss : 11

Threshold to get High Boss : 12

Threshold to get High Boss : 13

Threshold to get High Boss : 13

Threshold to get High Boss : 13

Threshold to get High Boss : 14

Threshold to get High Boss : 14

Threshold to get High Boss : 14

Game will random 6 songs from maxpoint shop (when machine is offline game will random it from pop mixing), player can select the song to play it. However the boss stage will random again after player complete all of 3 stage.

Technika 2 Disc Set

Threshold to get High Boss : 11

Threshold to get High Boss : 11

Threshold to get High Boss : 11

Threshold to get High Boss : 11

Threshold to get High Boss : 12

Threshold to get High Boss : 12

Threshold to get High Boss : 12

Threshold to get High Boss : 13

Threshold to get High Boss : 14

Technika 3 Disc Set

Threshold to get High Boss : 11

Threshold to get High Boss : 11

Threshold to get High Boss : 11

Buy from Maxpoint Shop / Cost : 5,000 Max PointThreshold to get High Boss : 11

Threshold to get High Boss : 12

Threshold to get High Boss : 12

Buy from Maxpoint Shop / Cost : 7,000 Max PointThreshold to get High Boss : 12

Buy from Maxpoint Shop / Cost : 8,000 Max PointThreshold to get High Boss : 13

Buy from Maxpoint Shop / Cost : 10,000 Max PointThreshold to get High Boss : 14

Buy from Maxpoint Shop / Cost : 12,000 Max PointThreshold to get High Boss : 14

Buy from Maxpoint Shop / Cost : 7,000 Max Point'

Buy from Maxpoint Shop / Cost : 15,000 Max Point

Buy from Maxpoint Shop / Cost : 18,000 Max Point

Buy from Maxpoint Shop / Cost : 20,000 Max Point

Crew Challenge Mission

Crew Mission (Weekly)
To use this mode, crew member status required.

Challenge Mission

Require : DJ Level 1

Require : DJ Level 7

Require : DJ Level 13

Require : DJ Level 19

Require : DJ Level 25

Require : DJ Level 30

Require : DJ Level 37

Special Mission

See also
DJMax Technika

References

External links
 Platinum Crew (Korean)
 Platinum Crew (International)
 DJMax Technika 3 (China mainland)

2011 video games
Technika
Arcade video games
Arcade-only video games
Video games developed in South Korea
Video games scored by Shinji Hosoe
Music video games